Dukhless  sometimes referred to as Soulless, is a 2012 Russian black comedy-drama film directed by Roman Prygunov and based on the novel Soulless: Tale of an Unreal Man by Sergey Minaev. It was selected as the opening film of the 34th Moscow International Film Festival.

First, the movie was scheduled to be released in Autumn 2011 but was released on 21 June 2012 during the 34th Moscow International Film Festival. The film was screened in theaters on 4 October 2012. The sequel was released on 5 March 2015.

Plot
The film tells a story of a 29-year-old top manager named Max Andreev (Danila Kozlovsky) who is an ambitious achiever of his goals, leading to happiness by earning and spending his money in most lavish ways: expensive luxury cars, penthouse dwellings, night clubs, posh girls, parties and drugs became the attributes of his life.

But one day Max meets a 19-year-old girl named Yulia, a lower-middle-class university student, who has a "McJob" for a living, and who occasionally participates in various social activism groups of Moscow. Realizing that he wasted 10 years of his life away, Max decides to befriend Yulia, and together they live through numerous turning points (peripeteias), shaking and changing both of their lives for the better.

Cast
Danila Kozlovsky – Max Andreev, Top-manager.
Mariya Andreyeva – Yulia, student, activist in "Free Radicals" group
Artyom Mikhalkov – Vadim, Max's friend
Nikita Panfilov – Misha Voudu
Artur Smolyaninov – Avdei, Head of "Free Radicals" group
Mikhail Efremov – Alexey Alexeyevich Kondratov, Bank Director, Max's boss
Maria Kozhevnikova – Elvira, model, Max's girlfriend
Sergei Belogolovtsev – Volodya Gulyakin, Director of Saint Petersburg Branch of the Bank
Sasha Budro – Alan Garrido, Bank's Vice-President
Dmitry Dorokhov – Sasha.
Natalia Samolyotova – Oksana
Oksana Kutuzova – Alyona Suvorova, former Max's girlfriend
OIgor Voinarovsky – Parkhomenko.
Anna Naumenko – Katya, Max's secretary 
Alexey Shakhbanov – Kostya
Marina Kazankova – Natalia Victorevna, Gulyakin's Vice
Daniil Vorobyov – Mr. X

Production
Danila Kozlovsky, who played the main role, broke his hand during filming. Despite this, he continued his acting, including difficult parts like night club scenes, dances and intimate scenes. He did such an impeccable job, people who watched the film were not aware of the incident.

Box office
Russia & CIS Countries (666+21 of copy)

Ukraine (78 of copy)

The film earned during hire in the territory of Russia and the CIS $13 364 412. At cinemas it was seen by nearly 2 million viewers. Interest to the film remained throughout almost all weekends.

Sequel
Dukhless 2 premiered on 5 March 2015 in Russian only. It became one of the most successful Russian films of 2015 to date.

The movie is a continuation of the story of Max Andreev, with Kozlovsky, as well as the other actors, reprising their roles. Three years after the events of the first film, Max lives alone on the Indonesian island of Bali, having escaped his former life (including Yulia). His new life is nothing like the old, and Max enjoys it, until eventually he is framed for drug possession on behalf of some shady persona (who later turns out to be one of his former buddies), and is deported to his homeland. Max thus starts living yet another life, which forces him to become a fugitive activist fighting for his rights and the safety of those he loves.

The cast includes Danila Kozlovsky, Maria Andreeva, Dominique Pinon, Vladimir Simonov, Sergei Burunov, Pavel Vorojtsov and Miloš Biković.

The shooting was held in Moscow and on Bali island in Indonesia. Film's budget was 140 million rubles.

See also
Selfie – a film based on the novel Soulless of the 21st century. Selfie by Sergey Minaev.

References

External links
 
 website

Russian drama films
2012 drama films
2012 films
Universal Pictures films
Films produced by Fyodor Bondarchuk
2010s Russian-language films